Anthony Barclay is an English actor who has appeared in productions including Domina for Sky Atlantic, The Irregulars for Netflix, Britannia for Sky Atlantic and Common as Muck for the BBC. He played Anthony Berg in Shaun Severi's film Citizen versus Kane which won the Canal+ Award at Clermont Ferrand International Film Festival and which earned Barclay a Best Actor nomination.

Barclay is the son of Danny Williams, a 1960s balladeer best known for the song "Moon River" which he got to No1 in 1961 before going on to have hits both in the UK and the USA. He has three children with former wife Doon Mackichan and one child with current wife, Antonia Fiber-Barclay.

Career highlights

He played Young Buddy in Stephen Sondheim's Follies in the West End, and worked again with Sondheim as The Balladeer in Sam Mendes' production of Assassins at London's Donmar Warehouse. Notable roles in theatre include: Aziz in Sasha Wares production of Timberlake Wertenbaker's Credible Witness at The Royal Court, alongside Oscar-winning actress Olympia Dukakis; Hogarth in The Iron Man by Ted Hughes and Pete Townsend at The Young Vic Theatre; Feste in Lucy Bailey's production of Twelfth Night  at The Royal Exchange; Agamemnon in The Iphigenia Quartet at The Gate Theatre, London and Japheth in John Caird and Stephen Schwartz's production of Children of Eden in London's West End.

Notable roles on television include: Corvinus in Domina,  Josephus the Levantine AKA The Traveller in Britannia season 2, Herod Antipas in Jesus: His Life, Florian in Carla Lane's Screaming, Sunil in Common As Muck, Karl Harper in Coronation Street, Sir Tim Listfield in Judge John Deed and Carlos Alvarez in New Tricks.

Barclay spent 2010-13 working with Steven Berkoff in Berkoff's Biblical Tales at the Hampstead Theatre; in Oedipus: After Sophocles at the Nottingham Playhouse, the Liverpool Playhouse, the Pleasance Grand in Edinburgh and the Memminger Theatre in South Carolina for the Spoleto Festival, USA; and Line-Up/Gas in the Steven Berkoff Season at the Jermyn Street Theatre in London; notable because Steven Berkoff was one of the main inspirations for Barclay as a young actor after he saw Berkoff's production of West'' at the Donmar Warehouse.

References

External links
 

British male television actors
Living people
British male stage actors
Place of birth missing (living people)
Black British male actors
English people of South African descent
Year of birth missing (living people)